‘Abd al-Ghanī ibn ‘Abd al-Wāḥid al-Jammā’īlī al-Maqdisi (1146-1203 CE) was a classical Sunni Islamic scholar and a prominent Hadith master. His full name was al-Imam al-Hafidh Abu Muhammad Abdul-Ghani ibn Abdul-Wahid bin Alī bin Surūr Ibn Rāfi' bin Hussain bin Ja'far al-Maqdisi al-Jammāʻīlī al-Hanbali. He was born in 1146 CE (541 AH) in the village of Jummail in Palestine. He studied with scholars in Damascus; many of whom were from his own extended family. He studied with the Imam of Tasawwuf, Shaykh Abdul Qadir al-Jilani.  He was the first person to establish a school on Mount Qasioun near Damascus.  He died in 1203 CE (600 AH).

He was a relative of Diya al-Din al-Maqdisi, as his mother and Diya al-Din al-Maqdisi's grandmother were sisters. He had three sons named Muhammad, Abdullah and Abdur-Rahman, all of whom became prominent scholars. The scholar, Ibn Qudamah al-Maqdisi was the maternal cousin of Abdul-Ghani, and Ibn Qudāmah described his association with Abdul-Ghani as:

"My friend in childhood and in seeking knowledge, and never did we race to goodness except that he would precede me to it, with the exception of [a] small [number of occasions]"

He was the author of Al-Kamal fi Asma' al-Rijal, a collection of biographies of hadith narrators within the Islamic discipline of biographical evaluation.

Works
His works include:
 Kitāb ut-Tawḥīd
 Akhbār Ad-Dajjāl
 Al-`Itiqād - A short text that outlines the foundational creed.
 Al-Jāmi' as-Saghīr Li Ahkām al-Bashīr an-Nadhīr
 I`tiqād ul-Imām Ash-Shafi`ī -The author shows the complete agreement between all the Imams on foundational theology and particularly the Imam’s dislike for speculative theology.
 Al-Ahkām
 Al-Arba'īn Min Kalām Rabbil-Aalamīn
 Amr bi-l-Maʿrūf wa-n-Nahy ʿani-l-Munkar
 At-Targhīb fid-Du'ā al-Hathth Alayhi
 At-Tawakkul was Su'āl Allāh Azza wa Jall
 Al-Aathār al-Mardiyyah Fī Fadā'il Khayr il-Bariyyah
 Al-Iqtiṣād fil-I'tiqād-This is a book on advanced theology that itemises creed into a series of themes.
 Al-Miṣbaḥ fī `Uyun il-Aḥādith aṣ-Ṣiḥaḥ
 Mukhtaṣar Sīrah an-Nabī wa Sīrah Aṣḥabihi al-‘Asharah (Short Biographies of the Prophet and His Ten Companions who were given the Tidings of Paradise)
 Ṭuḥfat ut-Ṭālibīn fīl Jīhad wal-Mujāhidīn
 Umdat ul-Aḥkām min Kalām Khayr il-Kalām 
 Umdat ul-Aḥkām al-kubrā - Extended version of Umdat ul-Aḥkām min Kalām Khayr il-Kalām.
 Faḍā'il ul-Hajj
 Faḍā'il us-Ṣadaqah
 Faḍā'il Ashar Dhil-Hijjah
 Faḍā'il Umar bin al-Khattāb
 Faḍā'il Makkah
 Al-Kamāl Fī Ma'rifat ir-Rijāl
 Miḥnah Imām Aḥmad bin Ḥanbal

See also
Maqdisi (nesbat)
History of Hadith

References

Bibliography

External links
 Biodata at MuslimScholars.info

1146 births
1203 deaths
Syrian Sunni Muslim scholars of Islam
12th-century Muslim scholars of Islam
Hadith scholars
Hanbalis
12th-century jurists
13th-century jurists
12th-century Arabs